This article lists events from the year 2019 in Mozambique.

Incumbents
 President: Filipe Nyusi
 Prime Minister: Carlos Agostinho do Rosário

Events.                                      
 March 15 – Cyclone Idai makes landfall on Mozambique, causing at least 1,073 fatalities, as well as mass flooding and power outages in southern Africa.
 15 October: Mozambique, President and Parliament

Deaths

References

Links

 
2010s in Mozambique
Years of the 21st century in Mozambique
Mozambique
Mozambique